"Don't Look Back" is the third English single released from the Mexican Latin pop singer Thalía's crossover  2003 album, Thalía. The song was written by Martin Harrington, Ash Howes and Rob Davis, and produced by Martin Harrington and Ash Howes; its melody is nearly identical to that of Kylie Minogue's "Love at First Sight", also co-written by Harrington and Howes.  A Spanish version of the song was recorded and included on Thalía's album, Toda la Felicidad. The remix version reached #9 position of "Billboard's Dance/Club Play Songs".

Track listings
U.S. CD single (Norty Cotto Remixes)
"Don't Look Back" [Norty Cotto Club Remix] – 7:40
"Don't Look Back" [English Radio Mix] – 3:39
"Don't Look Back" [Norty Cotto A Little Bit 'O Dub] – 6:37

U.S. 12" vinyl single (Norty Cotto Remixes)
"Don't Look Back" [Norty Cotto Club Remix] – 7:40
"Don't Look Back" [Norty Cotto A Little Bit 'O Dub] – 6:37

U.S. 12" vinyl single ('Jason Nevins Remixes)
"Don't Look Back" [Jason Nevins "Rock Da Club" Remix] – 7:28
"Don't Look Back" [Jason Nevins "Rock Da Dub" Remix] – 5:45

Official remixes/versions
"Don't Look Back" [Album Version] – 3:14
"Don't Look Back" [Norty Cotto English Club Mix] – 7:38
"Don't Look Back" [Norty Cotto English Radio Mix] – 3:39
"Don't Look Back" [Norty Cotto A Little Bit 'O Dub] – 6:32
"Don't Look Back" [Norty Cotto Spanglish Club Mix] - 7:36
"Don't Look Back" [Norty Cotto Spanglish Radio Edit] - 3:37
"Don't Look Back" [Jason Nevins "Rock Da Club" Remix] – 7:28
"Don't Look Back" [Jason Nevins "Rock Da Dub" Remix] – 5:45
"Don't Look Back" [Jason Nevins "Rock Da Club" Radio Edit]
"Don't Look Back" [Jason Nevins "Rock Da Club" Radio Edit Extended]
"Toda la Felicidad" [Spanish Version of "Don't Look Back"]

Charts

References

Thalía songs
2003 songs
2004 singles
Songs written by Rob Davis (musician)
Songs written by Ash Howes
Songs written by Martin Harrington
Virgin Records singles
English-language Mexican songs